Dissociation, in the wide sense of the word, is an act of disuniting or separating a complex object into parts. Dissociation may also refer to:

 Dissociation (chemistry), general process in which molecules or ionic compounds (complexes, or salts) split into smaller particles, usually in a reversible manner
 Dissociation (neuropsychology), identification of the neural substrate of a particular brain function through various methods
 Dissociation (psychology), an experience of having one's attention and emotions detached from the environment
 Dissociation (rhetoric), a rhetorical device in which the speaker separates a notion considered to form a unitary concept into two new notions to affect an audience in some way
 Dissociation (album), by the Dillinger Escape Plan, 2016

See also
 Dissociation: Progress in the Dissociative Disorders (1988-1997) published by International Society for the Study of Trauma and Dissociation
 "Disassociation", a 2021 song by the Rions
 Dissociative, a class of hallucinogen